Donia may refer to:

People 
 Donia Hamed, Egyptian model
 Donia Nachshen (1903–1987), Ukrainian-born British book illustrator and poster artist
 Donia Samir Ghanem, Egyptian actress and singer
 Pier Gerlofs Donia (c. 1480–1520), Frisian rebel leader and pirate
 Haring Harinxma (1323–1404), or Haring Donia, Frisian chieftain 
 Tony Donia, Canadian soccer player

Places
 Donia, Chad
 Donia, Guinea,

Other uses 
 Donia (mite), a genus of mites
 Donia R.Br. 1813, synonym of Grindelia Willd. 1807, a genus of gumweeds
 Donia G. Don & D. Don ex G.Don 1832, synonym of Clianthus Sol. ex Lindl. 1835, a genus of legumes

See also 

Donka (disambiguation)
 Donya (disambiguation)
 Donja, a component in the names of 
 Doña, a Spanish honorific title